Ain't No Shame in My Game is the debut studio album by American rapper Candyman. It was released on October 2, 1990 via Epic Records with distribution by CBS Records Inc. Production was handled by the Candyland Band and executive producer Ken Komisar. The album peaked at number 40 on the Billboard 200 and number 18 on the Top R&B/Hip-Hop Albums chart in the United States, and number 65 on the Album Top 100 in the Netherlands. It was certified gold by the Recording Industry Association of America on December 18, 1990.

The album spawned three hit singles: "Knockin' Boots", "Melt in Your Mouth" and "Nightgown". Its lead single, "Knockin' Boots", reached number-one position in the Netherlands, number 9 in Belgium and in the United States, and number 28 in Germany. "Melt in Your Mouth" peaked at number 41 in the Netherlands and number 69 in the United States. "Nightgown" made it to number 91 in the United States.

Track listing

Personnel
Candyman – vocals, producer
Charlie W. Mackie – bass, producer
Johnny Lee Jackson – producer
Shatasha Williams – producer
Dette – producer
Tea-Fly – producer
DJ Scratch – producer
Ken Komisar – executive producer
Donovan "The Dirt Biker" Sound – engineering
Tony Cannella – engineering
Brian Gardner – mastering
Mary Maurer – art direction
Todd Gray – photography
Jon Willoughby – management
Chris Lawmaster – management

Charts

Weekly charts

Year-end charts

Certifications

References

External links

1990 debut albums
Candyman (rapper) albums
Pop-rap albums
Epic Records albums
Albums produced by Johnny "J"